Albert John Whittington (1 January 1885 – 4 July 1969) was an Australian rules footballer who played with the Geelong Football Club in the VFL. He scored after the siren to tie the game for Geelong against Melbourne, the score at 54 all in 1911.

References

External links

Australian rules footballers from Victoria (Australia)
Geelong Football Club players
1885 births
1969 deaths